Receptor tyrosine phosphatases are enzyme-linked receptor phosphatases, a sub-class of protein tyrosine phosphatases.

Types include PTPRA,  PTPRB,  PTPRC,  PTPRD,  PTPRE,  PTPRF,  PTPRG,  PTPRH,  PTPRJ,  PTPRK,  PTPRM,  PTPRN,  PTPRN2,  PTPRO,  PTPRQ,  PTPRR,  PTPRS,  PTPRT,  PTPRU, and PTPRZ.

References

Transmembrane receptors
Single-pass transmembrane proteins